Malaysia competed at the 2014 Summer Youth Olympics, in Nanjing, China from 16 to 28 August 2014.

On 22 August 2014, Cheam June Wei became the first Malaysian to win a Youth Olympic gold medal when he won the badminton mixed doubles gold with Hong Kong's Ng Tsz Yau as his partner. Also, National men archer Mohd Zarif Syahiir won silver in archery mixed team medal with Germany's Cynthia Freywald at the Youth Olympic Games in Nanjing. However both gold and silver was not credited to the individual nation's medal tally as the event was a mixed-National Olympic Committees event in which athletes from different nations team up to compete under the Olympic flag. National woman diver Loh Zhiayi won a silver and bronze medal in the 10m platform individual event and women's 3m springboard event at the Youth Olympic Games 2014.

Medalists
Medals awarded to participants of mixed-NOC teams are represented in italics. These medals are not included towards the individual NOC medal tally.

Archery

Malaysia qualified a male archer from its performance at the 2013 World Archery Youth Championships.

Individual

Team

Athletics

Malaysia qualified three athletes.

Qualification Legend: Q=Final A (medal); qB=Final B (non-medal); qC=Final C (non-medal); qD=Final D (non-medal); qE=Final E (non-medal)

Boys
Track event

Field event

Girls
Field event

Badminton

Malaysia qualified two athletes based on 2 May 2014 BWF Junior World Rankings.

On 22 August 2014, Cheam June Wei won the mixed doubles gold medal with Hong Kong's Ng Tsz Yau as his partner. They defeated Kanta Tsuneyama of Japan and Lee Chia-hsin of Taiwan in the finals which lasted 30 minutes. The gold however, was not credited to Malaysia or Hong Kong in the overall medal tally as it was a mixed-NOCs event in which athletes from different nations team up to compete under the Olympic flag.

Singles

Doubles

Diving

Malaysia qualified two quotas based on its performance at the Nanjing 2014 Diving Qualifying Event.

Equestrian

Malaysia qualified a rider.

Golf

Malaysia qualified two athletes based on 8 June 2014 IGF World Amateur Golf Rankings.

Individual

Team

Gymnastics

Artistic

Malaysia qualified one athlete based on its performance at the 2014 Asian Artistic Gymnastics Championships.

Boys

Rhythmic

Malaysia qualified one athlete based on its performance at the 2014 Asian Rhythmic Championships.

Individual

Sailing

Malaysia qualified two boats based on its performance at the Byte CII Asian Continental Qualifier.

Shooting

Malaysia was given a wild card to compete.

Individual

Team

Swimming

Malaysia qualified four swimmers.

Boys

Girls

Taekwondo

Malaysia qualified one athlete based on its performance at the Taekwondo Qualification Tournament.

Girls

References

2014 in Malaysian sport
Nations at the 2014 Summer Youth Olympics
Malaysia at the Youth Olympics